Jagua Nana is a 1961 novel by Nigerian novelist Cyprian Ekwensi. The novel was later republished in 1975 as part of the influential Heinemann African Writers Series.

The novel focuses on the contradictions within the life of an aging sex worker, the title character Jagua Nana. The novel is set in the city of Lagos. The novel has been compared to works by Charles Dickens, in terms of its moral assessment of the city and city life, and its critique of the social problems faced by people living in those cities. Critics of the work in the 1980s noted that the novel relies heavily on stereotypical depictions of women, hampering its depiction of life in Africa.

References

Further reading 

1961 Nigerian novels
Novels by Cyprian Ekwensi
Novels set in Lagos
African Writers Series
Novels about prostitution
Works about prostitution in Nigeria